Scott Gregory (born 7 January 1999) is a New Zealand rugby union player who plays for the  in Super Rugby and  in the Bunnings NPC. He was named in the Highlanders squad for the 2020 season.

Early career
Gregory was sighted at an early age, securing a three year deal with Northland for the 2017 Mitre 10 Cup at the age of 18. Gregory had a breakthrough year in 2018 which started with the Whangarei teen being selected and playing in all five of the New Zealand national under-20 rugby union team’s matches at the World Rugby Under 20 Championship. Gregory then returned to New Zealand and played a starring role in the  campaign, debuting off the bench in the first round and going on to play 10 matches. The young  star was later selected as a member of the New Zealand national rugby sevens team in the 2019 season, playing in several tournaments throughout the year and even debuting on the World Rugby Sevens Series in a championship win in Dubai.

Reference list

External links
itsrugby.co.uk profile

1999 births
New Zealand rugby union players
Living people
Rugby union centres
Northland rugby union players
Highlanders (rugby union) players
Rugby union wings
Rugby union fullbacks
Southland rugby union players